Ruth Briggs King (born March 8, 1956) is an American politician. She is a Republican member of the Delaware House of Representatives, representing district 37. After losing a primary race in 2000, she was elected to replace Republican Joseph Booth, who had won a special election to a seat in the Delaware Senate, in 2009.

Briggs King earned her AA in medical technology from Delaware Technical Community College and her BA and MA in human resources from Wilmington College. She has been a human resources consultant for Workforce Solutions since2019.

Electoral history
In 2000, Briggs King ran for District 41 in the Republican primary but lost. The incumbent representative, Democrat Charles West, went on to win the general election and served until 2003.
In 2009, Briggs King won the special election to replace Joseph Booth in District 37 with 2,429 votes (53.6%) against Democratic nominee Robert Robertson.
In 2010, Briggs King won the general election with 5,149 votes (61.8%) against Democratic nominee Frank Shade.
In 2012, Briggs King won the general election with 5,026 votes (54.8%) against Democratic nominee Elizabeth McGinn.
In 2014, Briggs King won the general election with 4,173 votes (65.3%) against Democratic nominee Paulette Ann Rappa.
In 2016, Briggs King won the general election with 6,720 votes (62.5%) in a rematch against Democratic nominee Paulette Ann Rappa.
In 2018, Briggs King was unopposed in the general election and won 6,853 votes.

Committees
Briggs King currently serves on the following committees:
Appropriations
Corrections
Education
Health & Human Development
Joint Finance
Manufactured Housing
Public Safety & Homeland Security
Transportation/Land Use and Infrastructure
Veterans Affairs

Personal life
Briggs King is married to Stanley King and they share two sons and six grandchildren.

References

External links
 Official page at the Delaware General Assembly
 Campaign site
 Ruth Briggs King's Profile on Ballotpedia
 

1956 births
Living people
Republican Party members of the Delaware House of Representatives
Women state legislators in Delaware
21st-century American women politicians
21st-century American politicians
Wilmington University alumni
People from Milford, Delaware